Songs for a Breakup: Vol. 1 is the debut studio EP by the American indie rock band Fitz and the Tantrums, released on August 11, 2009 through Canyon Productions. It was re-released in 2010 when the band signed to Dangerbird Records.

Track listing

Personnel
 Michael Fitzpatrick
 Noelle Scaggs
 Joseph Karnes
 James King
 Jeremy Ruzumna
 John Wicks

Additional personnel
Chris Seefried – producer, guitar, bass, vocals, keyboards
Maya Azucena – vocals
Sebastian Steinberg – bass
Matt Cooker – cello
Stewart Cole – trumpet
Scott Ellis – drums
Tay Strathairn – piano
Chris Constable – mixing
Josh Brochhausen  – mixing
Gavin Lurssen – mastering
Edon – photography
Alex Tenta – design, layout
Lisa Nupoff – management
Brian Klein – management

References

2009 debut EPs
Fitz and The Tantrums albums
Albums produced by Chris Seefried